In mathematics, a summation equation or discrete integral equation is an equation in which an unknown function appears under a summation sign. The theories of summation equations and integral equations can be unified as integral equations on time scales using time scale calculus. A summation equation compares to a difference equation as an integral equation compares to a differential equation.

The Volterra summation equation is:

where x is the unknown function, and s, a, t are integers, and f, k are known functions.

References

Summation equations or discrete integral equations

Integral equations